Courtois can refer to:

Locations 
Courtois-sur-Yonne, a commune in Yonne department, France
Courtois, Missouri, an unincorporated community
Courtois Creek, a creek in Missouri
Courtois Hills, a region in Missouri

Persons

Painters
Jean Courtois (herald) (died 1436), French herald
Jacques Courtois (1621–1676), French painter
Guillaume Courtois (1628–1679), French painter
Marie Courtois (c.1655–1703), French miniature painter
Gustave-Claude-Etienne Courtois (1852–1923), French painter

Science, medicine, technology
Bernard Courtois (1777–1838), French chemist, discoverer of iodine
Frédéric Courtois (1860–1928), French missionary and naturalist
Hélène Courtois, French astrophysicist
Jacques Courtois (Canada) (1920–1996) was a Canadian lawyer and public official
Donald Courtois, American electrical engineer, worked on NASA Apollo missions
Jean-Philippe Courtois, president of Microsoft International
Nicolas Courtois, French cryptographer, lecturer in computer science at University College London
Stéphane Courtois (born 1947), French historian, author and editor of Black Book of Communism

Music
Antoine Courtois (founded 1789), French manufacturer of brass instruments
Jean Courtois (composer) ( 15301545), Franco-Flemish composer
Lambert Courtois (c.1520–after 1583), French composer

Politics
 Edme-Bonaventure Courtois played a role in the Fall of Robespierre
 Jean-Patrick Courtois (born 1951),  member of the French Senate

Sports
Roger Courtois (1912–1972), French football player and manager
Jacques Courtois (ice hockey), president of the Montreal Canadiens 1972–79
Alain Courtois (born 1951), Belgian politician, Secretary General of the Belgian Football Association
Laurence Courtois (born 1976), Belgian former professional tennis player
Laurent Courtois (born 1978), French footballer
Imke Courtois (born 1988), Belgian footballer
Valérie Courtois (born 1990), Belgian volleyball player
Thibaut Courtois (born 1992), Belgian footballer

Fiction
Guiron le Courtois, character in 13th-century Arthurian legend

Other uses
Banque Courtois, oldest existing bank in France, now part of Crédit du Nord

French-language surnames
Surnames of Belgian origin